Mel Rosenberg (born Melvin Rosenberg, 12 November 1951 in Winnipeg, Manitoba, Canada) is a microbiologist best known for his research on the diagnosis and treatment of bad breath (halitosis).

Early life and education
Mel Rosenberg (Hebrew: מל רוזנברג) was born in Winnipeg, Manitoba, Canada in 1951. He grew up in Ottawa and immigrated to Israel in 1969. He received his Bachelor of Science from Hebrew University (1973) and went on to pursue both his Masters of Science (1975) and Ph.D. (1982) at Tel Aviv University.

Academic professional
Rosenberg performed his Ph.D. research in the field of petroleum microbiology, under the supervision of Eugene Rosenberg and David Gutnick.  His first publication as a graduate student, on the adhesion of microorganisms to oil droplets (1980), became the most highly cited publication of FEMS Microbiology Journal and a "Citation Classic" by the Science Citation Index of 1991.

After receiving his doctorate in microbiology, Rosenberg held various faculty academic positions at the Sackler Faculty of Medicine and Goldschleger School of Dental Medicine at Tel Aviv University, and has received honorary appointments at the University of Rochester, University of Pennsylvania, University College London (Eastman Dental Hospital) and University of Toronto.

Rosenberg's interest in the diagnosis and treatment of bad breath (halitosis) began in the mid 1980s.  Research conducted in his laboratory at Tel Aviv University led to the development of two-phase mouthwashes, now popular in the UK (under the name Dentyl Dual Action), in the US (under the name Colgate Total Advanced Health Mouthwash) and elsewhere.  He is also the inventor or co-inventor of several other patents, including two microbial inoculation tools, the Quadloop and the Diaslide, an upside-down spray for treatment of shoe odor, a deodorant for use in the shower, and an anti-microbial flavor combination (Breathanol). Rosenberg's research also led to the application of the Halimeter, a volatile sulfide monitor, as an adjunct apparatus for the measurement of oral malodor.  Rosenberg has edited several professional textbooks on bad breath and has written several reviews on the subject, notably "The Science of Bad Breath", published in Scientific American in 2002. Together with Anton Amann, he served as Editor-in-Chief of the Journal of Breath Research, published by the Institute of Physics, from its inception until 2013.

In addition to his academic teaching activities, Dr. Rosenberg has been active in public education through the TED organization, including speaking in three TEDx events, co-organizing the TEDxShenkarCollege events, and writing three animated lessons for TED-Ed, on bad breath, dental caries and body odor. His TED-ED video on bad breath has been viewed more than 5  million times.

Mel Rosenberg pursues parallel careers as a jazz singer and musician, and author of children's books. He is co-founder of Ourboox, a platform for online publishing of digital picture books. He appeared in a small role in the film JeruZalem in 2015. At the end of 2021 Mel became the founding host of the "New Books in Children's Literature channel" on the New Books Network. .

Selected publications

 
 
 
  presenting a circumferential overview of Halitosis.
  which shows the effect of mouth rinsing on the oral bacteria.
  This article shows how hydrophobicity of CPC affects oral bacteria, as the research basis for the invention of a two-phase mouthwash.
  which was the basis for the commercial use of sulphide monitors such as the Halimeter to measure halitosis.
  starting an academic debate on the role of periodontitis in halitosis.
  another article which shows the relation between a periodontal test to malodor parameters.
  laying an important grounds to research of the psychopathological aspects of halitosis.

References

External links
 Dr. Rosenberg's personal website
 Mel Rosenberg's Tel-Aviv University website
 Organizer of TEDx Event at Shenkar College
 Ourboox, Mel Rosenberg's platform for creating and sharing interactive e-books
 Mel's Ten Tips for Avoiding Bad Breath

Living people
Canadian microbiologists
Academic staff of Tel Aviv University
1951 births
Israeli microbiologists